KYOO may refer to:

 KYOO (AM), a radio station (1200 AM) licensed to Bolivar, Missouri, United States
 KYOO-FM, a radio station (99.1 FM) licensed to Half Way, Missouri, United States